The following is a list of the MuchMusic Video Awards winners for Best Independent Video. As of 2008 this award has become defunct and has merged with the VideoFACT Award as one award.

MuchMusic Video Awards